Hone Peneamine Anatipa Te Pona Tūwhare (21 October 1922 – 16 January 2008) was a noted Māori New Zealand poet. He is closely associated with The Catlins in the Southland region of New Zealand, where he lived for the latter part of his life.

Early years
Tūwhare was born in Kokewai, Northland, into the Ngāpuhi tribe (hapu Ngati Korokoro, Ngati Tautahi, Te Popoto, Uri-o-hau). Following the death of his mother, his family shifted to Auckland, where Hone attended primary schools in Avondale, Mangere and Ponsonby. He apprenticed as a boilermaker with the New Zealand Railways and took night classes in Mathematics, Trade Drawing and Trade Theory at Seddon Memorial Technical College (1939–41) and Otahuhu College (1941). Tūwhare spoke Māori until he was about 9, and his father, an accomplished orator and storyteller, encouraged his son's interest in the written and spoken word, especially in the rhythms and imagery of the Old Testament.

Poetry career 
Starting in 1939, Tūwhare, encouraged by fellow poet R.A.K. Mason, began to write while working as an apprentice at the Otahuhu Railway Workshops.

In 1956, Tūwhare started writing seriously after resigning from a local branch of the Communist party. His first, and arguably best known work, No Ordinary Sun, was published in 1964 to widespread acclaim and subsequently reprinted ten times over the next 30 years, becoming one of the most widely read individual collections of poetry in New Zealand history.

When Tūwhare's poems first began to appear in the late 1950s and early 1960s they were recognised as a new departure in New Zealand poetry, cutting across the debates and divisions between the 1930s and post-war generations. Much of the works' originality was the result of their distinctly Māori perspective. The poems were marked by their tonal variety, the naturalness with which they could move between formal and informal registers, between humour and pathos, intimacy and controlled anger and, especially, in their assumption of easy vernacular familiarity with New Zealand readers.

During the 1970s Tūwhare became involved in Māori cultural and political initiatives. This same era also saw his international reputation grow, with invitations to visit both China and Germany, which, among other opportunities, lead to the publication of Was wirklicher ist als Sterben in 1985.

While his earlier poems were kept in print, new work was constantly produced. Tūwhare's play, "In the Wilderness Without a Hat", was published in 1991. Three further collections of poetry then followed: Short Back and Sideways: Poems & Prose (1992), Deep River Talk (1993), and Shape-Shifter (1997). In 1999 he was named New Zealand's second Te Mata Poet Laureate, the outcome of which was the publication Piggy-Back Moon (2002).

The poet moved to Kaka Point in South Otago in 1992, and many of his later poems reflected the scenery of The Catlins area, and the seafood available. He had a strong working relationship with fellow Otago artist Ralph Hotere, and their work often referenced each other.
Tūwhare's poem "Rain" was in 2007 voted New Zealand's favourite poem by a clear margin.

Poetry by Tūwhare was included in UPU, a curation of Pacific Island writers’ work which was first presented at the Silo Theatre as part of the Auckland Arts Festival in March 2020. UPU was remounted as part of the Kia Mau Festival in Wellington in June 2021.

Recognition and awards 
Tūwhare was awarded the Robert Burns Fellowship from the University of Otago in 1969 and again in 1974. He was awarded the University of Auckland Literary Fellowship in 1991. In 1999, he was named New Zealand's second Te Mata Poet Laureate. At the end of his two-year term he published Piggy Back Moon (2001), which was shortlisted in the 2002 Montana New Zealand Book Awards.

Tūwhare was among ten of New Zealand's greatest living artists named as Arts Foundation of New Zealand Icon Artists at a ceremony in 2003.

In 2003, Tūwhare was awarded one of the inaugural Prime Minister's Awards for Literary Achievement, for poetry. The other winners were novelist Janet Frame and historian Michael King. Each recipient received a cash prize of $60,000 NZD. The awards are aimed at New Zealand writers who have made an outstanding contribution to the nation's literary and cultural history.

Tūwhare received an honorary Doctor of Literature degree from The University of Auckland in 2005. At the time of his death Tūwhare was described as "New Zealand's most distinguished Maori writer"*.

Hone Tūwhare Charitable Trust 
In July 2010 the Hone Tūwhare Charitable trust was formed in honour of Tūwhare. Their goal is: "To inspire people through the preservation, promotion, and celebration of Hone’s legacy".

Works

No Ordinary Sun, Auckland, Blackwood and Janet Paul, 1964
Come Rain Hail, Dunedin, University of Otago, 1970
Sapwood and Milk, Dunedin, Caveman Press, 1972
 Something Nothing, Dunedin, Caveman Press, 1973
 Making a Fist of It, Dunedin, Jackstraw Press, 1978
 Selected Poems, Dunedin, McIndoe, 1980
 Year of the Dog. Dunedin, McIndoe, 1982
 Was wirklicher ist als Sterben, Straelen, Straelener-Ms.-Verl, 1985
 Mihi: Collected Poems, Auckland, Penguin, 1987
 Short Back & Sideways, Auckland, Godwit, 1992
 Deep River Talk: Collected Poems, Honolulu, University of Hawaii Press, 1994
 Shape-Shifter, Wellington, Steele Roberts, 1997
 Piggy-back Moon, Auckland, Godwit, 2001
 Oooooo......!!!, Wellington, Steele Roberts, 2005
 ‘’ Friend ‘’,Whangarei, Noah

See also 
 New Zealand literature
 Tūwhare - a compilation album of his poems remade by New Zealand artists into songs as a dedication to him.

References

External links

 Hone Tūwhare – full-length documentary available on NZ On Screen
 Biography of Hone Tūwhare as well as links to relevant television appearances and programmes on NZ On Screen
 Tūwhare's biography on Poetry International Web
 Timeline of Hone Tūwhare
 New Zealand Herald - Tributes flow for Poet and Playwright Hone Tūwhare
  from the Dictionary of New Zealand Biography
 Website for Hone Tūwhare Charitable Trust

1922 births
2008 deaths
Ngāpuhi people
Te Uri-o-Hau people
New Zealand Poets Laureate
New Zealand male poets
People from Otago
People from the Catlins
People from Kaikohe
New Zealand Māori writers
People educated at Otahuhu College
20th-century New Zealand poets
20th-century New Zealand male writers